Gionna Jene Daddio (born June 8, 1994) is an American professional wrestler and actress. She is signed to WWE, where she performs on the SmackDown brand under the ring name Liv Morgan. She is a former SmackDown Women's Champion.

In 2014, Daddio signed a contract with WWE and was assigned to the WWE Performance Center, later appearing in NXT under the Liv Morgan name. She was promoted to the main roster in 2017 and was paired with Ruby Riott and Sarah Logan to form the stable The Riott Squad. After the stable disbanded in 2019, Morgan became a singles competitor. After a few months of her singles run, she reunited with the returning Riott, who had been out of action for months with a shoulder injury, to reform the Riott Squad, now as a duo rather than a trio due to the release of Logan. Morgan and Riott performed together until Riott's release in 2021. In 2022, Morgan won the Women's Money in the Bank ladder match and would cash in the same night, defeating Ronda Rousey to win the SmackDown Women's Championship, the first title in her wrestling career.

Early life 
Gionna Jene Daddio was born in Morristown, New Jersey, on June 8, 1994. She was raised in nearby Elmwood Park, New Jersey. She has four older brothers and a sister; following the death of Daddio's father, her mother raised all six children as a single mother. Daddio is a longtime fan of professional wrestling, and would participate in backyard wrestling with her siblings. She has described the matches as core to start her foray into wrestling:

Daddio was a former competitive cheerleader, and worked and modelled for the restaurant chain Hooters.

Professional wrestling career

WWE

NXT (2014–2017) 

In 2014, after being discovered at Joe DeFranco's gym in Wyckoff, New Jersey, Daddio signed a contract with WWE, assigning her to their developmental territory, NXT in October 2014. She made her first televised appearance at the NXT TakeOver: Rival pay-per-view on February 11, 2015, as a planted fan who jumped on Tyler Breeze during his entrance. She appeared at NXT TakeOver: Unstoppable on May 20, again as part of Breeze's entrance. In October 2015, she briefly worked under the ring name Marley,<ref name="marley" debuting on the November 4 episode of NXT, where she worked as a jobber and lost to Eva Marie.

On the December 2 episode of NXT, Daddio made her return under the new ring name Liv Morgan, losing to Emma. On the January 13, 2016, episode of NXT, Morgan competed in a battle royal to determine the number one contender to Bayley's NXT Women's Championship, which was won by Carmella. On the August 31 episode of NXT, Morgan picked up her first televised singles win, defeating Aliyah. She later began a rivalry with The Iconic Duo (Billie Kay and Peyton Royce), with both women confronting her following her match, leading to a match between Morgan and Kay two weeks later, which Kay won after interference by Royce. She then competed against Royce on the November 16 episode of NXT, which ended in a disqualification after Kay interfered in the match, attacking Morgan and Aliyah until Ember Moon made the save. The three faced off in a six-person tag team match against Kay, Royce, and Daria Berenato on the November 23 episode of NXT, with Morgan's team coming out victorious.

The Riott Squad (2017–2019) 

On the November 21, 2017, episode of SmackDown Live, Morgan made her main roster debut alongside Ruby Riott and Sarah Logan, attacking both Becky Lynch and Naomi, establishing themselves as heels in the process. On the same night, they interrupted a match between SmackDown Women's Champion Charlotte Flair and Natalya, then proceeded to attack both of them. The following week on SmackDown Live, the trio, now called "The Riott Squad", made their in-ring debuts for the brand, defeating Flair, Naomi, and Natalya in a six-woman tag team match. On January 28, 2018, Morgan participated in the first women's Royal Rumble match at the Royal Rumble pay-per-view as the eleventh entrant, but was eliminated by Michelle McCool. Morgan made her WrestleMania debut at WrestleMania 34 on April 8 by participating in the 20-woman WrestleMania Women's Battle Royal, but failed to win the match.

On April 16, The Riott Squad were drafted to Raw brand as part of the 2018 Superstar Shake-Up, and caused the match between Bayley and Sasha Banks to end in a no contest. At the inaugural all women's pay-per-view Evolution on October 28, The Riott Squad lost to Natalya, Bayley and Sasha Banks. On January 27, 2019, at Royal Rumble, Morgan participated in the women's Royal Rumble match, only to be the first to be eliminated after lasting 8 seconds, setting the record for the shortest time in the women's Royal Rumble match. Morgan and Logan competed in a six-team Elimination Chamber match for the inaugural WWE Women's Tag Team Championship at the namesake pay-per-view on February 17, where they were the third team eliminated by Nia Jax and Tamina. Morgan competed at WrestleMania 35 on April 7 in a women's battle royal match that was eventually won by Carmella.

Brand switches and championship pursuits (2019–2022) 

On April 16, Morgan was moved to the SmackDown brand as part of the Superstar Shake-up, effectively dissolving The Riott Squad in the process. On the July 16 episode of SmackDown Live, Morgan turned face when she confronted Charlotte Flair and faced her in a match, in which Morgan lost by submission.

On the October 14 episode of Raw, Morgan was the final overall pick of the year's draft, being drafted back to the Raw brand. Throughout the month of December, vignettes aired promoting Morgan's return. Morgan returned to television on the December 30 episode of Raw, during Bobby Lashley and Lana's storyline wedding, interrupting the proceedings and professing her love for Lana. After Lana subsequently attacked her, she aligned herself with Rusev, who had been feuding with Lana and Lashley, thus cementing her face turn. Morgan defeated Lana on the January 27, 2020, episode of Raw, doing so once again the following week. After her feud with Lana ended, Morgan entered a feud with her former Riott Squad teammate Ruby Riott who turned on her upon returning. On the March 2 episode of Raw, Morgan defeated Riott with Sarah Logan as the special guest referee. At Elimination Chamber on March 8, Morgan entered her second Elimination chamber match, during which she was eliminated by eventual winner Shayna Baszler. On the WrestleMania 36 pre-show on April 5, Morgan defeated Natalya. After WrestleMania, Morgan continued her feud with Riott and defeated her on the April 20 and 27 episodes of Raw respectively.

After Morgan lost to Natalya on the June 22 episode of Raw, Ruby Riott attempted to console Morgan backstage after her loss, which she rebuffed. On the August 3 episode of Raw, Riott asked Morgan to join her in reforming the Riott Squad, only to be interrupted by The IIconics, who mocked the two; this led to a tag team match where Morgan and Riott defeated The IIconics. At Payback on August 30, Morgan and Riott (now officially known as The Riott Squad again) defeated The IIconics and once more the following night on Raw, forcing The IIconics to disband, per stipulation.

As part of the 2020 Draft in October, Morgan and Riott were drafted to the SmackDown brand. She won a fatal four-way match during her first night on SmackDown after the Draft to qualify for the women's team at Survivor Series on November 22, in which she and her brand partners lost. They challenged for a shot at the Women's Tag Team Championship on the first night of WrestleMania 37 on April 10, but failed to win the match. Riott was released by WWE on June 2, 2021, effectively disbanding The Riott Squad for the second time.

Morgan competed in the Money in the Bank ladder match at the eponymous event on July 18, but failed to win the match. At Extreme Rules on September 26, Morgan defeated Carmella in the pre-show. As part of the 2021 Draft, Morgan was drafted to the Raw brand. In October, Morgan entered the Queen's Crown tournament, where she lost to Carmella in the first round. On the November 8 episode of Raw, Morgan won a fatal 5-way match to earn a shot at the Raw Women's Championship, which was held by Becky Lynch. Morgan received her title match against Lynch on the December 6 episode of Raw, but lost. Morgan failed to win the title in a rematch at Day 1 on January 1, 2022. She participated in the Royal Rumble match at the namesake event on January 19, entering at #6 but was eliminated by Brie Bella. At Elimination Chamber on February 19, Morgan entered the Elimination Chamber match for a Raw Women's Championship match at WrestleMania 38, eliminating Doudrop but was eliminated by Alexa Bliss. In March, Morgan began teaming with Rhea Ripley, challenging for the Women's Tag Team Championship in a fatal four-way tag team match on the second night of WrestleMania 38 on April 3 in a losing effort. On the April 18 episode of Raw, they faced new champions Sasha Banks and Naomi for the titles, but lost, and after the match, Ripley would attack Morgan, ending their partnership. At Hell in a Cell on June 5, Morgan, AJ Styles and Finn Bálor lost to The Judgment Day (Edge, Damian Priest and Rhea Ripley) in a six-person mixed tag team match.

SmackDown Women's Champion (2022–present) 
On the June 13 episode of Raw, Morgan and Alexa Bliss defeated Doudrop and Nikki A.S.H. to qualify for the women's Money in the Bank ladder match. At the event on July 2, Morgan won the Money in the Bank contract, granting her a women's championship match at any time of her choosing. Later that night, following the SmackDown Women's Championship match between Natalya and Ronda Rousey, Morgan cashed in her contract on the latter to win the title, making her the third woman and fifth superstar to successfully cash-in the Money in the Bank contract the same night after winning it. A rematch between Morgan and Rousey was set for SummerSlam on July 30, where Morgan controversially retained the title; Morgan tapped out to Rousey's armbar, but the referee had counted Rousey's shoulders down, giving the pinfall win to Morgan. After the match, both Morgan and the referee were attacked by Rousey. At Clash at the Castle on September 3, Morgan retained the title against Shayna Baszler. Rousey won a fatal five-way elimination match on the September 9 episode of SmackDown, earning a rematch against Morgan at Extreme Rules. The following week, Morgan challenged Rousey to an Extreme Rules match for the title, which Rousey accepted. At the event on October 8, Morgan lost the SmackDown Women's Championship back to Rousey, ending her reign at 98 days.

Morgan then entered the women's Royal Rumble match at the titular event on January 28, 2023. She entered at #2 and lasted over one hour before being the last one eliminated by the match's winner and first entrant Rhea Ripley; Ripley and Morgan hence eclipsed Bianca Belair's record of 56:52 set at the 2021 Royal Rumble, with official times of 1:01:08 and 1:01:07 respectively. She then took part in the women's Elimination Chamber match at the titular event on February 18, but was eliminated by Natalya and Asuka.

Other media 
Morgan made her video game debut as a playable character in WWE 2K19, and later appeared in WWE 2K20, WWE 2K Battlegrounds, WWE 2K22, and WWE 2K23.

In June 2022, it was announced that Morgan will make her first movie appearance in The Kill Room, starring alongside Maya Hawke, Samuel L. Jackson and Uma Thurman. In October, it was confirmed that Morgan would make a guest appearance on the second season of Chucky.

Personal life 
In November 2020, Daddio confirmed in a screenshot on Twitter that she had taken up a course to become a real estate agent at the Bob Hogue School of Real Estate.

Filmography

Championships and accomplishments 
 Pro Wrestling Illustrated
 Ranked No. 53 of the top 100 female wrestlers in the PWI Women's 100 in 2018
 Ranked No. 137 of the top 150 female wrestlers in the PWI Women's 150 in 2021
 Ranked No. 48 of the top 50 Tag Teams in the PWI Tag Team 50 in 2021 - with Ruby Riott
 Ranked No. 17 of the top 150 female wrestlers in the PWI Women's 150 in 2022
WWE
 WWE SmackDown Women's Championship (1 time)
 Women's Money in the Bank (2022)

References

External links 

 
 
 

1994 births
American female professional wrestlers
American professional wrestlers of Italian descent
Female models from New Jersey
Living people
People from Elmwood Park, New Jersey
People from Paramus, New Jersey
Professional wrestlers from New Jersey
Sportspeople from Bergen County, New Jersey
21st-century American women
21st-century professional wrestlers
WWE SmackDown Women's Champions